Budacu de Jos is a commune in Bistrița-Năsăud County, Transylvania, Romania. It is composed of five villages: Budacu de Jos, Buduș (Alsóbudak;Budesdorf), Jelna (Kiszsolna; Senndorf), Monariu (Malomárka; Minarken), and Simionești (Simontelke; Seimersdorf).

The commune is situated on the Transylvanian Plateau, at the foot of the Călimani Mountains. The river Budac (a tributary of the Șieu) flows through the commune. 

County road DJ172G connects the component villages of the commune, while road DJ173C leads to the city of Bistrița.

At the 2011 census, 78.97% of inhabitants were Romanians and 17.93% Roma.

Sights

Natives
Iulian Pop

References

Communes in Bistrița-Năsăud County
Localities in Transylvania